The Friedrichshafen FF.40 was a German three-seat floatplane of the 1910s produced by Flugzeugbau Friedrichshafen.

Development and design
The FF.40 was designed to meet a German Imperial Navy requirement for a three-seat patrol seaplane. It was a biplane but had an unusual powerplant design. The Maybach Mb.IV was fitted in the fuselage and drove two tractor propellers mounted just forward of and between the wings on each side. Only one aircraft was built.

Operators

German Imperial Navy

Specifications (FF.40)

See also

References

Bibliography

Further reading

1910s German military reconnaissance aircraft
Floatplanes
Biplanes
Single-engined twin-prop tractor aircraft
FF.40
Aircraft first flown in 1916